Jorge Pérez may refer to:

Jorge Pérez (swimmer) (born 1972), Spanish Olympic swimmer
Jorge Pérez (alpine skier) (born 1961), Spanish alpine skier
Jorge Pérez (dancer) (born 1964), American dancer, choreographer, educator, and director
Jorge M. Pérez (born 1950), American real estate developer and author
Jorge Pérez Vento (born 1947), Cuban Olympic volleyball player
Jorge Pérez (cyclist) (born 1951), Cuban Olympic cyclist
Jorge Armando Pérez, Cuban humanitarian, author, and evangelist
Jorge Iván Pérez (born 1990), Argentine footballer
 Jorge Pérez (footballer) (born 1975), Spanish footballer